Cottica River (Sranan Tongo: Kotika-liba) is a river in the northwest of Suriname.

It originates in the hills surrounding town of Moengo and flows westwards and enters the Commewijne River.

It has a river basin of 2.900 km2.

References 
 

Rivers of Suriname
Marowijne District
Commewijne District